William Harry Atkinson III (September 16, 1934 – March 15, 2010) was an American auto dealer and stock car racing driver. He competed in one event in the NASCAR Grand National Division, now the NASCAR Cup Series.

Personal life
Born in Waycross, Georgia in 1934, Atkinson and his family moved to Bunnell, Florida in 1943, with his father purchasing the Bunnell Motor Company in 1944. A 1952 graduate of Bunnell High School, Atkinson took over the business upon the death of his father in 1962, operating the company until 1975. He also served two terms as a city commissioner in Bunnell.

Racing career
Atkinson competed in stock car auto racing during the early and mid-1950s, competing in a single event in the NASCAR Grand National Division in 1956 at the Daytona Beach and Road Course. Starting 48th in a field of 80 cars, Atkinson finished 51st overall in the No. 265 Ford owned by his father.

Atkinson, through the Bunnell Motor Company, sponsored the 1967 Daytona 500-winning car of Mario Andretti.

Death
Atkinson died of natural causes on March 15, 2010, at his home in Bunnell. He had been married for 35 years and had three sons and two daughters.

References

External links
 

1934 births
2010 deaths
People from Bunnell, Florida
Racing drivers from Florida
NASCAR drivers
People from Waycross, Georgia